Remilekun Khalid Safaru (born on January 26, 1981), known by his stage names Reminisce and Alaga Ibile, is a Nigerian singer, rapper, songwriter, and actor from Ogun State. He performs in English and in his native language, Yoruba.

Early life

Reminisce is from Ajilete, Yewa South LGA in Ogun State, the western part of Nigeria. He was born on 26 January 1981, in Kaduna state, Northern Nigeria. In school, he listened to various genres of local and foreign music and performed in school activities. He studied Purchasing & Supply at Kwara State Polytechnic.

Music career

He recorded his first song in a studio in 2006 and recorded a hardcore rap album at Coded Tunes, but the album was never released and he decided to focus on his studies and complete schooling. His first single, “Ever Since”, featured 9ice, and was a story about his life till that moment. His second, “If Only”, was a love song produced by Dtunez.

In 2014, TIME Magazine named Reminisce one of the seven "World Rappers You Should Meet” He was also named by Nigerian music site, NotJustOk, as one of the top three hip hop artists of 2014.

His song titled "Local Rappers" in 2015, which he featured Olamide and Phyno had some controversial comments from fans as they felt the song was targeted at rappers who rap with English language such as MI and Mode9. In 2015, Reminisce was named a brand ambassador for the Orijin alcoholic beverage brand.

Reminisce is signed to Edge Records and is also the founder and creative director of LRR Records.

Book of Rap Stories

Reminisce's first album, Book of Rap Stories, was released on 31 March 2012. He started recording the album since 2010 after linking up with the studio producer Sarz at Edge Records Studios. The studio allowed him to make the album bilingual. The album was produced by Sarz, Legendury Beatz, Joshbeatz, Jospo and PastorChild. The album did well commercially in the southern part of Nigeria.

ALAGA IBILE

His second album, ALAGA IBILE, was officially released on 15 November 2013. The album featured Wizkid, Naeto c, Davido, Olamide and Sossick and the singles Eleniyan, featuring Wizkid, Daddy featuring Davido, Fantasi and 3rd World Thug. Reminisce worked with producers Sossick, Sarz, Chopstix and Jospo.

The album sold an estimated million copies before the end of 2014. In 2014, Time Magazine named Reminisce as one of seven "world rappers you should meet".

Baba Hafusa

Reminisce's third album, Baba Hafusa, was released in 2015.  Just recently, Reminisce became the first hip hop artist in Africa to have an album debut on Billboard Charts World Music category at no. 12.

Described as a “genre busting album”, it was a strong contender for album of the year with music critics and fans alike applauding the fusion of sounds to form a unique blend of hip hop, fuji and afrobeats.

Vibes & Insha Allah EP

Reminisce released the EP Vibes & Insha Allah in July 2020 during the COVID-19 pandemic in Nigeria. The EP garnered over 4.5 million streams on Audiomack in 4 months.

The music project consists of 6-tracks and features the artists Fireboy DML, Mo Safaru and Fatimah Safaru. Production was completed by Tmxo, Krizbeatz, Sarz and others.

Discography

Studio albums
Book of Rap Stories (2012)
ALAGA IBILE (2013)
Baba Hafusa (2015)
El-Hadj (2016)

Singles
 One Chance
 Ever Since ft 9ice
 If Only
 Kako Bii Chicken
 2musshh
 Fantasi
 Government ft Olamide, Endia
 Daddy ft Davido
 Eleniyan ft Wizkid
 Turn It Around
 Tesojue
 "Local Rappers"
 Skilashi
 Kpomo (Remix) Feat. Lil Kesh, CDQ, Falz, Seriki
 Angelina 
Ponmile (2017)
Problem (2018)
Ajigijaga (2018)
Do You Feel It (2018)
Oja (2019)
Jensimi (featuring Niniola (2019)
Instagram (featuring Olamide, Naira Marley, Sarz (2019)Prosperity (featuring Falz ) (2020)Toxic (featuring Adekunle Gold (2020)Videography

Features and collaborationsASHEWO Performed by Phenom (2013)SHEKPE Performed by M.I(2014)KING KONG [REMIX] Performed by Vector (2015)69 Missed Call Ft Jahbless, Chinko Ekun, Lil Kesh, Olamide, CDQ, Reminisce
 Ibile performed by Lil Kesh (2016)
 If E No Be God performed by Mr Eazi
 Diet by Dj Enimoney (2018)Aye by CDQ (2018)Original Gangstar'' by Sess (2018)

References

Nigerian male rappers
Yoruba musicians
Musicians from Ogun State
Living people
Nigerian male musicians
English-language singers from Nigeria
Yoruba-language singers
21st-century Nigerian musicians
The Headies winners
21st-century male musicians
1981 births